The 1928 Frankford Yellow Jackets season was their fifth in the National Football League. The team improved on their previous league output of 6–9–3, winning eleven games. They finished second in the league standings.

Schedule

Standings

References

Frankford Yellow Jackets seasons
Frankford Yellow Jackets